Simon Tookoome (December 9, 1934, Chantrey Inlet - November 7, 2010 Baker Lake) was an Utkusiksalingmiut Inuk artist.

Life
In his youth, Tookoome and other Utkusiksalingmiut lived along the Back River and in Gjoa Haven on King William Island. Here he met and was influenced by the Netsilik Inuit.

He moved to Baker Lake, Nunavut, Canada in the 1960s when his Inuit band was threatened with starvation. After the arrival of arts advisors in 1969, Tookoome began to draw and carve stones. He was a founding member of the Sanavik Co-op.

Tookoome died in Baker Lake, Nunavut on 7 November 2010.

Work
He was the author, with Sheldon Oberman, of the children's book Shaman's Nephew: A Life in the Far North, which won the $10,000 Norma Fleck Award for Canadian children's non-fiction in 2000. This autobiographical book deals with Tookoome's youthful experiences of the traditional Inuit way of life, including experiences with hunting and encountering non-Inuit culture for the first time. He was also included in Irene Avaalaaqiaq Myth and Reality:

In addition to being an accomplished artist, Tookoome was renowned as a master whipper.

References

 Nasby, Judith, and Irene Avaalaaqiaq Tiktaalaaq. Irene Avaalaaqiaq Myth and Reality. Montreal: MQUP, 2002.

External links
Tookoome's work at the Centre for Contemporary Canadian Art

1934 births
2010 deaths
Inuit sculptors
People from Baker Lake
Artists from Nunavut
Inuit from the Northwest Territories
Inuit from Nunavut
People from Gjoa Haven
Canadian children's writers
Inuit writers
20th-century Canadian sculptors